Craigs Chapel AME Zion Church is a historic church in Greenback, Tennessee.

Craigs Chapel is one of several historic African-American churches in rural Tennessee that had a black school and a cemetery located alongside the church, on the same plot of land. The church was built in 1896 and was followed by an elementary school in 1899 and the cemetery in 1903.

It was added to the National Register of Historic Places in 2001.

References

African Methodist Episcopal Zion churches in Tennessee
Churches on the National Register of Historic Places in Tennessee
Buildings and structures in Loudon County, Tennessee
Historic districts on the National Register of Historic Places in Tennessee
National Register of Historic Places in Loudon County, Tennessee